Haploa confusa, the confused haploa or Lyman's haploa, is a moth of the family Erebidae that occurs in North America. The species was first described by H. H. Lyman in 1887. The caterpillars feed on a hound's tongue (Cynoglossum officinale).

Description
Adult
Adults have cream-colored forewings with brown markings and almost completely white hindwings.

Caterpillar
The caterpillar is black with straight yellow dorsal stripes, sub-dorsal stripes and a broad lateral stripe.

References

Moths of North America
Callimorphina
Moths described in 1887